Belfry is an unincorporated community in Pike County, Kentucky. Belfry has a post office with ZIP code 41514, which opened on February 26, 1921. The origin of the name "Belfry" is obscure.

The larger community of South Williamson borders Belfry to northwest.

Public education in Belfry is administered by the Pike County Public School System, which operates Belfry High School. Schools also include Belfry Elementary School (formally known as Southside Elementary) and Belfry Middle School. Belfry has a lending library, a branch of the Pike County Public Library.

Demographics

Notable people
 Jim Ramey (born 1957), gridiron football player

References

Unincorporated communities in Pike County, Kentucky
Unincorporated communities in Kentucky